Zarathoustra is the second studio album by Deathline International, released on November 16, 1995 by COP International.

Reception
Black Monday called Zarathoustra "remarkable, intelligent and a must for your collection" and "this is human creativity mingling with technology via expressive interpretation of life, knowledge and freedom." Sonic Boom said that a "fan of all forms of industrial music should find something addicting on this album as Deathline International refused to be constrained within the fragile shell of a particular genre and instead prefer to utilize elements of all of them."

Track listing

Personnel
Adapted from the Zarathoustra liner notes.

Deathline International
 Shawn Brice (as Spawn) – vocals, producer, executive-producer, engineering
 Christian Petke (as Count Zero) – singing, producer, engineering, illustrations

Additional performers
 Keith Arem – remixer (15)
 Maria Azevedo – vocals
 I-Li Chang Brice – percussion
 Warren Harrison – keyboards, drums
 Don Gordon – remixer and producer (16)
 Scott Holderby – vocals
 Seppl Niemeyer – drums
 Rey Osburn – guitar
 Mark Pistel – remixer (6)
 Suzanne Santos – vocals
 Thomas Smith – guitar
 Evan Sornstein (Curium Design) – saxophone, illustrations, design

Release history

References

External links 
 Zarathoustra at Discogs (list of releases)

1995 albums
Deathline International albums
COP International albums